Idol Show (lit. Idol Corps, She Has Arrived!), also called Idol Army, is a weekly Korean variety show on MBC Every 1 hosted by the nation's most popular teen idol groups.

Hosts

Idol Guest Stars

Season 1
First aired: July 10, 2008 
Episode 1 - Jewelry
Episode 2 - without Super Junior FT Island & Brown Eyed Girls
Episode 3 & 4 - Wonder Girls
Episode 5 - Kara
Episode 6 - Roo'ra
Episode 7 - Baby Vox Re.V
Episode 8 - 2AM
Episode 9 & 10 - Han Seungyeon, Goo Hara, Joo, Moon Ji Eun, Lim So Young
Episode 11 - Kim Na Young, Chun Ja, Han Young
Episode 12 - Kim Na Young, Seulong, Lim So Young
Episode 13 & 14 (finale) - Lee Chung Ah

Season 2
First aired: October 16, 2008
Episode 1 & 2 - Younha
Episode 3 & 4 - 2PM, Hwangbo, Baek Boram
Episode 5
Episode 6 & 7 (finale)- Kim Na Young, Kim Sang Mi, Min Ji, Choi Eun Joo, Jamilla

Season 3
First aired: December 4, 2008
Episode 1 - none
Episode 2 - Kara
Episode 3 - High School Girls and ulzzang nunas
Episode 4 - 2AM, Jang Young Ran, Go Young Wook
Episode 5 - Brown Eyed Girls
Episode 6 - Foreign girls
Episode 7 - none
Episode 8 & 9 - Girls' Generation
Episode 10 - Going to MT
Episode 11 - High School Girls and friends
Episode 12 - College Girls
Episode 13- Black Pearl, Jung Joori, Lee Chaeyeong, Baek Boram, Kim Jungmin, Jin Bora (Star Golden Bell parody Special)
Episode 14 & 15 - SHINee
Episode 16 - After School
Episode 17 (finale)

Season 4
First aired: April 2, 2009
Episode 1 - none
Episode 2 - Daesung
Episode 3 - Lee Chun-hee
Episode 4 - FT Island
Episode 5 (finale) - 2AM

Season 5
First aired: December 16, 2009
Episode 1 - Kwon JiHye
Episode 2 - Secret
Episode 3 - T-ara
Episode 4 - Kim Na Young, Kim Sae Rom, Kang Ye Bin
Episode 5 - None (Queen Seon Duk Parody/Lee Joon's Hidden Camera)
Episode 6 - Soo Jung (Star Golden Bell)
Episode 7 & 8 - After School
Episode 9 & 10 - None (Ski Resort Special)
Episode 11 - IU, Kim Eun Jung (Jewelry), Ha Joo Yeon (Jewelry), Hong Jin Young
Episode 12 -  Transfer Girls
Episode 13 & 14 - Sulli
Episode 15 - None (Health Check-up)
Episode 16 - (finale)

References

South Korean variety television shows
South Korean reality television series
2008 South Korean television series debuts
2010 South Korean television series endings